Upperville may refer to:

Upperville, Virginia, a city in Virginia
The Battle of Upperville, an American Civil War battle
Upperville (band), a band founded by Chris Merritt